The 2022 Geelong Football Club season was the club's 158th season playing Australian rules football, with the club competing in their 123rd season in the Australian Football League (AFL). Geelong also fielded a women's team in both the 2022 AFL Women's season and AFL Women's season seven, and a men's and women's reserves team in the Victorian Football League (VFL) and the VFL Women's (VFLW) respectively.

AFL team

Season summary
It was the club's twelfth AFL season under senior coach Chris Scott, with Joel Selwood appointed as club captain for a seventh successive year. In the 2022 AFL season Geelong finished the home-and-away season with an 18-4 record, to finish on top of the league ladder to claim the McClelland Trophy, and qualify for the 2022 finals series. The club would win consecutive finals at the Melbourne Cricket Ground to qualify for the 2022 AFL Grand Final where it defeated  20.13 (133) to 8.4 (52) to claim the club's tenth V/AFL premiership.

After the home-and-away season, Jeremy Cameron and Tom Hawkins were the club's leading goalkickers with 59 goals each. Cameron and Hawkins were both selected in the 2022 All-Australian team along with backman Tom Stewart, utility Mark Blicavs, and fellow forward Tyson Stengle. Young full-back Sam De Koning finished second in the AFL Rising Star to Collingwood's Nick Daicos.

Pre-season

Geelong defeated  in a pre-season scratch match at GMHBA Stadium played over six periods with both senior and reserves players. The final score was Geelong 20.27 (147) vs. Richmond 21.16 (142). Geelong also competed in 2022 AAMI Community Series against  and were defeated 13.17 (95) vs. Geelong's 11.6 (72). Geelong's home-and-away season began on 19 March against  at the Melbourne Cricket Ground (MCG).

Coaching staff
Chris Scott continued as the club's men's senior coach for a twelfth season, and in May 2022, signed a two-year contract extension until the end of the 2024 season.

Following the end of the 2021 season, Geelong overhauled their football department, with Matthew Scarlett, Corey Enright, and Matthew Knights departing. Several former Geelong players joined the football department as their replacements. Coming in as head of medical and conditioning services were Harry Taylor, head of player development Matthew Egan, and development coaches James Kelly and Josh Jenkins. Joining them were Jason Lappin (football analyst) and the recently retired Eddie Betts (development).

Geelong instituted a non-traditional coaching structure in 2022 with the club moving away from assistant coaches being responsible for specific positions.

Playing list

Changes 
At the end of the 2021 AFL season, three players (Josh Jenkins, Lachie Henderson, and Stefan Okunbor) retired, and four players (Ben Jarvis, Cameron Taheny, Oscar Brownless, and Charlie Constable) were delisted.

  Tyson Stengle was delisted by  during the 2021 pre-season

Statistics

Results

Ladder

Awards

League awards
Norm Smith Medal: Isaac Smith
Gary Ayres Award: Patrick Dangerfield
All-Australian: Tom Hawkins (C), Mark Blicavs, Jeremy Cameron, Tyson Stengle, Tom Stewart

Club Awards
Carji Greeves Medal: Jeremy Cameron & Cameron Guthrie
Best Young Player Award: Sam De Koning
Tom Harley Best Clubman: Tom Atkins
Carter Family Community Champion Award: Joel Selwood

VFL team

Coached by Shane O'Bree, Geelong entered their reserve players into the Victorian Football League competition for the 22nd season since the competition merged with the AFL Reserves competition in 2000. Former  player Matt Ling was appointed co-captain with Jackson McLachlan.

In the 18-match home-and-away season played over 22 rounds, Geelong did not qualify for the finals, finishing 14th on the ladder with a 8–10 win-loss record. Hit by injuries and availability issues, over 60 players made at least one VFL appearance for the season, with only co-captains Ling and McLachlan featuring in all 18 matches with Daniel Capiron. AFL-listed player Shannon Neale kicked 33 goals from 15 appearances to be the leading goalkicker for the club.

Ladder

Awards
 Best and Fairest: Jye Chalcraft
 Little Vic Award (Best first year player): Ben Lloyd

Women's team

2022 season summary
Following the departure of inaugural coach Paul Hood, the club appointed former Geelong player Daniel Lowther as head coach. Lowther had previously joined the AFLW team coaching staff in 2020 as an assistant coach looking after the midfield.

Number two pick in the 2021 AFL Women's draft Georgie Prespakis was nominated for the Rising Star Award, for her performance in the opening round of the season against ; with 2020 draftee Darcy Moloney also nominated for the award later in the season.

Playing list

Recruitment

Statistics

Results

Ladder

Awards

League awards
 AFL Players Association 22under22 squad: Rebecca Webster, Georgie Prespakis

Club Awards
 Best and fairest: Amy McDonald
 Geelong AFLW Fan MVP: Amy McDonald
 The 'Hoops' Award: Kate Darby
 Community Champion: Georgie Rankin

VFLW Season

Results

Ladder

Awards 
Best and Fairest: Paige Sheppard
VFL Women's Team of the Year: Laura Gardiner , Paige Sheppard

AFL Women's season seven

The club qualified for the AFLW finals series for the first time since Geelong's inaugural season in the competition in 2019.

Geelong's score of 15.12 (102) and winning margin of 75 points against  in Round 10 was the club's highest score and biggest win in the AFLW; with the first-half score of 9.6 (60) the highest first-half score in AFLW history.

Results

Ladder

Awards

League awards
 AFL Women's season seven All-Australian team: Georgie Prespakis ; Chloe Scheer ; Amy McDonald 
 Mark of the Year: Chloe Scheer 
 AFL Players Association 22under22 squad: Nina Morrison; Georgie Prespakis; Annabel Johnson

Club Awards
 Best and fairest: Amy McDonald
 Geelong AFLW Fan MVP: Georgie Prespakis
 The 'Hoops' Award: Mikayla Bowen
 Community Champion: Kate Darby & Georgie Rankin

Notes

References

External links 
 Official website of the Geelong Football Club

2022
Geelong Football Club